Jennifer E. Strong (June 24, 1973 – March 27, 2011) was an American soccer player who played as a defender, making one appearance for the United States women's national team.

Career
Strong played soccer for the North Penn Maidens in high school, before playing for the UConn Huskies in 1991 and 1992, where she was a letter-winner. She was included in the Soccer America All-Freshmen Team in 1991, as well as the NSCAA/Adidas All-Northeast Region and NEWISA All-New England selections in 1992. In 1993, she played for the Barry Buccaneers, helping the team to win the NCAA Division II championship. After taking a year break from soccer, she again played for the Buccaneers in 1995. In total, she scored 4 goals and recorded 8 assists in 37 appearances during her two seasons with the Buccaneers. She was an NSCAA All-American in 1995, and was selected to the NSCAA All-Region Team in 1993 and 1995. She was also included in the NCAA All-Tournament Team in 1993, and was selected as a CoSIDA Academic All-American and All-District player in 1996.

Strong made her only international appearance for the United States on August 16, 1992, in a friendly match against Norway, which finished as a 2–4 loss.

Strong was selected for the Umbro Select College All-Star Classic in 1996. Later that year she served as an assistant coach for the Villanova Wildcats. She was inducted into the Barry University Athletics Hall of Fame in 1998.

Personal life
Strong graduated from the Philadelphia College of Osteopathic Medicine. She served in the United States Army for seven years and was discharged as a Major. She later worked in obstetrics and gynecology in Grand Junction, Colorado. Strong died on March 27, 2011, at the age of 37 in Grand Junction.

Career statistics

International

References

1973 births
2011 deaths
People from Lansdale, Pennsylvania
Soccer players from Pennsylvania
American women's soccer players
American women's soccer coaches
United States women's international soccer players
Women's association football defenders
UConn Huskies women's soccer players
Barry University alumni
Female United States Army officers
American osteopathic physicians
Physicians from Pennsylvania
21st-century American women physicians
21st-century American physicians
American gynecologists
American obstetricians
Women gynaecologists
Military personnel from Pennsylvania